Apache Chief is a 1949 American Western film directed by Frank McDonald and starring Alan Curtis, Tom Neal, Russell Hayden, Carol Thurston and Fuzzy Knight.

Premise
A Native American chief is against his tribesmen killing white settlers. To keep the peace he must firstly deal with renegade Apache Black Wolf.

Cast
 Alan Curtis as Young Eagle
 Tom Neal as Lt. Brown
 Russell Hayden as Black Wolf
 Carol Thurston as Watona
 Fuzzy Knight as Nevada Smith
 Trevor Bardette as Chief Big Crow
 Francis McDonald as Mohaska
 Ted Hecht as Pani
 Alan Wells as Lame Bull
 William Wilkerson as Grey Cloud (as Billy Wilkerson)
 Rodd Redwing as Tewa (as Roderic Redwing)

References

External links
 
 

1949 films
1949 Western (genre) films
American Western (genre) films
1940s English-language films
Films directed by Frank McDonald
Films scored by Albert Glasser
Lippert Pictures films
1940s American films